Camerolaelaps is a genus of mites in the family Laelapidae.

Species
 Camerolaelaps yaoundensis (Taufflieb & Mouchet, 1956)

References

Laelapidae